Invictus (Iconoclast III) is the sixth studio album by German extreme metal band Heaven Shall Burn and is the last part of the Iconoclast trilogy, following their previous studio album Iconoclast (Part 1: The Final Resistance) released in 2008 and the live CD/DVD Bildersturm – Iconoclast II (The Visual Resistance) released in 2009.

It was released on May 21, 2010 in Germany, Austria and Switzerland. On June 8, 2010 it was released in the United States. The band uploaded the songs "Combat" and "The Omen" on their Myspace profile as a preview.

The album entered the German Media Control Charts at #9. Selling 900 copies in the first week Invictus entered the US Top Heatseekers at #48

Track listing

The limited edition includes, a wristband, a sticker and a bonus DVD containing a special live performance in Vienna with the theme "Defending Sparta". Inspired by the movie 300, the band chose 300 fans, gave them special T-shirts and let them have a battle on the band's music.

Credits 
Production and performance credits are adapted from the album liner notes.

Heaven Shall Burn
 Marcus Bischoff – vocals
 Alexander Dietz – guitars, producer, engineer
 Maik Weichert – guitars, producer
 Eric Bischoff – bass
 Matthias Voigt – drums

Production
 Tue Madsen – mixing, mastering
 Patrick W. Engel – engineering, additional guitars and bass
 Ralf Müller – engineering
 Red Design – box design
 Joshua Andrew Belanger – digipak design
 Stefan Wibbeke – additional design

Additional musicians
 Sabine Weniger (Deadlock) – additional vocals on "Given in Death"
 Sebastian Reichl (Deadlock) – additional guitar on "Given in Death"
 Patrick Schleitzer – additional vocals
 Ólafur Arnalds – "Intro" and "Outro"

Production ("Defending Sparta")
 Alexander Dietz – recording, mixing
 Patrick W. Engel – mixing, mastering
 Werner Stockinger – show production
 Benjamin Mahnert – show production
 Maik Weichert – show production
 Steffen "Slayer" Jochmann – FoH sound
 Martin Kames – light design

Release history

Chart performance

References

External links 

2010 albums
Century Media Records albums
Heaven Shall Burn albums